

Motu o Kura / Bare Island is a small island located in the Pacific Ocean in the southern Hawke's Bay on the eastern shores of the North Island of New Zealand.

On the south-west side of the island, there is an aquifer exuding fresh water (called Nga Puhake-o-te-ora or "the burp of life"). From the shore Motu o Kura is bare, but from the seaward side, there is enough cover to provide resting sites for blue penguins and sooty shearwaters.

When Jules Dumont d'Urville sailed past in 1827 he reported houses and boats on the seaward side.

Following the passage of the Heretaunga Tamatea Claims Settlement Act 2018, the name of the island was officially altered to Motu o Kura / Bare Island.

The legend of Motu-o-Kura
The New Zealand Ministry for Culture and Heritage gives a translation of "island of Kura" for Motu-O-Kura. According to Māori legend, Kura was a mighty woman who, during times of siege, would dive down to obtain fresh water from the aquifer behind the island under the ocean in the place called Te Puhake o te Ora (well of living waters) as there is no fresh water found on Motu o Kura.

See also

 List of islands of New Zealand
 List of islands
 Desert island

References

External links
 University of Auckland

Hastings District
Uninhabited islands of New Zealand
Landforms of the Hawke's Bay Region